Boophis blommersae is a species of frog in the family Mantellidae. It is endemic to northern Madagascar and is known from two locations, Montagne d'Ambre and the vicinity of Tsaratanana. There is also a recent from near Bemanevika. The specific name blommersae honours Rose Marie Antoinette Blommers-Schlösser, a Dutch herpetologist and entomologist.

Description
Adult males measure  in snout–vent length. The fingers have some webbing while the toes are more extensively webbed. Skin is dorsally smooth. Dorsal colouration is highly variable: uniformly light brown, brown with a large dark hourglass pattern, or brown with lichen-like yellow or pink spots. The throat is transparent with a green shade, while the belly is centrally silvery white and laterally transparent. The iris is light brown to grey, with some reddish-brown colour and greenish yellow periphery. The legs have rather indistinct dark crossbands. The finger and the toe tips are greenish.

Habitat and conservation
The tadpoles develop in streams. It is a very common species but tolerates only slight habitat modification — it is threatened by habitat loss caused by subsistence agriculture, timber extraction, charcoal manufacture, the spread of eucalyptus, and expanding human settlements. However, it occurs in the well-managed Montagne d'Ambre National Park and the Tsaratanana Reserve, and in the planned Bemanevika protected area.

References

blommersae
Endemic frogs of Madagascar
Amphibians described in 1994
Taxa named by Frank Glaw
Taxa named by Miguel Vences
Taxonomy articles created by Polbot